Greenville Mall is a  shopping mall in Greenville, North Carolina, United States owned and managed by Brookfield Properties. It is located at the corner of Greenville and Arlington Boulevards.

History
Greenville Mall was originally built as a strip center named Pitt Plaza, which opened in 1966 with J. C. Penney as an anchor. It was announced in 1984 that the shopping center was to be converted into a 300,000 sq ft enclosed shopping mall called The Plaza, managed by Pentagon Properties of Raleigh.  It was subsequently renamed Colonial Mall Greenville when purchased by Colonial Properties Trust.  The purchase of the mall by GG&A in 2007 resulted in the name being changed to Greenville Mall.

The mall has 65 stores, with Belk, J. C. Penney and Dunham's Sports as anchor stores.

References

External links
Greenville Mall

Greenville, North Carolina
Buildings and structures in Pitt County, North Carolina
Brookfield Properties
Shopping malls in North Carolina
Shopping malls established in 1965